Carter is an unincorporated community located in northern Yazoo County, Mississippi.

Carter has a zip code of 39194.

Residents are within the Yazoo County School District. Residents are zoned to Yazoo County Middle School and Yazoo County High School.

References

Unincorporated communities in Yazoo County, Mississippi
Unincorporated communities in Mississippi